The 2013–14 season was Hull City's first season back in the Premier League after automatic promotion as runner-up from the Championship in the 2012–13 season. They finished in 16th place, with their highest Premier League position and points total, to secure a further season in the Premier League. They also competed in the League Cup, reaching the 4th round. They also competed in the FA Cup, reaching their first ever final in the competition.

Events
George Boyd signed a two-year deal on 28 May 2013 to become a permanent member of the club from the start of the 2013–14 season when his contract with Peterborough United expired.

Maynor Figueroa signed a two-year deal on 17 June 2013 to move to City on a free transfer as his contract at Wigan Athletic was up at the end of the 2012–13 season.
The season's fixtures were announced on 19 June 2013 giving City an opening away tie against Chelsea on 17 August 2013. The season closes on 11 May 2014 with a home match against Everton.

On 2 July 2013, Hull signed Scottish international goalkeeper Allan McGregor on a three-year contract from Turkish club Beşiktaş for a fee of £1.8 million.
On 4 July 2013 goalkeeper Mark Oxley went on a season long loan to Football League One club Oldham Athletic, but was recalled on 27 March 2014 after Allan McGregor was dismissed for a second time and suffered kidney damage in the West Ham United match.
On 8 July 2013, Paul McShane signed a new two-year deal with the club.

On 15 July 2013, Hull signed goalkeeper Steve Harper, who was released by Newcastle United at the end of the 2012–13 season, on a one-year contract.
On 16 July 2013, Jack Hobbs went out on loan to Nottingham Forest until the end of the 2013–14 season. Though on 24 January 2014, he was recalled by City to cover for an injury to James Chester sustained in the match against Norwich City.

On 19 July 2013, striker Danny Graham was brought in on a season-long loan from Sunderland. Though the contract was terminated early and Graham moved on loan to Middlesbrough on transfer deadline day 31 January 2014.
On 26 July 2013, the club announced the signing of Ivorian striker Yannick Sagbo from French side Evian Thonon Gaillard on a two-year contract for an undisclosed fee.
On 1 August 2013, Tom Cairney went out on loan to Blackburn Rovers until January 2014.
On 2 August 2013, Corry Evans moved to Blackburn Rovers for an undisclosed fee.
On 9 August 2013, it was revealed that the club had been renamed Hull City Tigers Ltd.

On 14 August 2013, the club made a double signing from Tottenham Hotspur. England International Tom Huddlestone signed a three-year contract for an undisclosed fee, while mid-fielder Jake Livermore joined on a season-long loan deal.
The new squad number for the 2013–14 season were released on 16 August 2013.

On transfer deadline day, 2 September 2013, Conor Townsend moved out on loan to Carlisle United until 29 September 2013, while Cameron Stewart moved on loan to Charlton Athletic until January 2014. Returning to City on a season-long loan is Gedo from Al-Ahly, though this was terminated early, on 16 January 2014, by the club.
On 19 September 2013, the captain Robert Koren was ruled out for four to five weeks with foot injury.

On 23 September 2013, Conor Henderson was signed following a trial at the club.
On 26 September 2013, Conor Townsend's loan to Carlisle United was extended for two months.
On 27 September 2013, Matty Fryatt went on a month-long loan to Sheffield Wednesday. The loan was later extended to 30 November 2013.
On 1 October 2013, it was announced that Robbie Brady would be out of action for a month after undergoing a hernia operation. Following return. he experienced a groin injury that required further surgery, and in March 2014, it was announced that he would be out for the rest of the season.

On 11 October 2013, goalkeeper Joe Cracknell was loaned to Scarborough Athletic to cover injury to Jason White.
On 7 November 2013, it was reported that Sone Aluko would be out of action for up to ten weeks with an achilles injury after a problem during pre-match warm-up for the Sunderland match on 2 November 2013.

On 21 November 2013, Aaron McLean went out on an emergency loan to Birmingham City until 1 January 2014.
On 11 December 2013, it was reported that the club had formally asked The Football Association to change the club's name to Hull Tigers from the start of the 2014–15 season. On 15 January 2014, Assem Allam indicated he would leave the club "within 24-hours" if the name change was rejected by the FA. In March 2014, the FA membership committee advised that the name change be rejected. On 9 April 2014, the FA Council rejected the name change.

On 2 January 2014, Tom Cairney signed a -year deal with Blackburn Rovers who he had been on loan to.
On 3 January 2014, Sone Aluko signed a -year deal with the club.

On 3 January 2014, Conor Townsend returned on loan to Carlisle United until the end of the season.
On 7 January 2014, goalkeeper Eldin Jakupović went out on a month-long loan to Leyton Orient. But was recalled on 29 January 2014 to cover for Allan McGregor who was dismissed in the match against Crystal Palace the previous evening. On 13 February 2014, he returned to Leyton Orient on loan until 17 April 2014, but was again recalled on 27 March 2014 after Allan McGregor was dismissed for a second time and suffered kidney damage in the West Ham United match.
On 9 January 2014, Cameron Stewart went on loan to Leeds United for an emergency 93-day loan ahead of a permanent move to the club when his contract expires.
On 15 January 2014, Croatian striker Nikica Jelavić signed a three-and-a-half-year deal to join the club from Everton.
On 16 January 2014, Aaron McLean signed a two-and-a-half-year deal with League One club Bradford City.
On 17 January 2014, Shane Long signed a three-and-a-half-year deal to join the club from West Bromwich Albion for an undisclosed fee.
On 23 January 2014, Nick Proschwitz went out on loan to Barnsley for the remainder of the season.
 On 23 January 2014, it was reported that an injury to James Chester sustained in the match against Norwich City on 18 January would leave him sidelined for up to six-weeks.
 On 31 January 2014, Jack Hobbs was sold to Nottingham Forest for an undisclosed fee on a four-and-half-year contract.
 On 27 March 2014, Conor Henderson went out on loan to Stevenage for the rest of the season.
 On 28 March 2014, it was reported that goalkeeper Allan McGregor remained in hospital after suffering kidney damage in the match against West Ham United on 26 March and was likely to miss the remainder of the season.

On 1 April 2014, Yannick Sagbo and Benoît Assou-Ekotto, of Queens Park Rangers, were charged by the FA of improper conduct for social media posts about the quenelle gesture. The club have indicated they will vigorously defend Sagbo. On 22 April 2014, Sagbo was fined £15,000 but escaped a ban for the incident. Following an appeal by the FA, the player received a two-match ban for the incident on 12 June 2014.

On 20 April 2014, at half-time in the home match against Arsenal, the club announced they had signed a four-year deal with kit suppliers Umbro.

On 3 May 2014, it was confirmed that Hull City will enter the UEFA Europa League next season as FA Cup finalists, the club's first appearance on the European stage. They would start in the third qualifying round unless they win the FA Cup when they would progress straight to the group stages.

On 23 May 2014, Steve Harper signed a new one-year deal with the club. It was also reported that Abdoulaye Faye and Robert Koren had been released by the club.

On 10 June 2014, Matty Fryatt moved to Nottingham Forest on a free transfer.

Squad

Out on loan

Pre-season
The first pre-season matches were announced on 9 May 2013. First to be announced would be an away game against Birmingham City on 27 July 2013. The Billy Bly Memorial Trophy match was set for 15 July 2013 at Church Road against North Ferriby United and an away match against Peterborough United was scheduled for 29 July.
A fixture against Sheffield Wednesday on 20 July 2013 is to take place at Estadio Municipal de Albufeira as part of their training camp in Portugal. Three days later at the same ground a match against Portuguese side S.C. Braga will take place.

The squad reported back for pre-season training on 4 July 2013.

On 4 July 2013, a final pre-season match at the KC Stadium was announced against Spanish team Real Betis for 10 August 2013. The match would be a testimonial for Andy Dawson who would return to the club to appear in the fixture following his departure to Scunthorpe United.

On 16 July 2013, the team flew out to Portugal for a week-long pre-season training camp.

A further pre-season fixture was announced on 17 July 2013 against Dynamo Dresden on 3 August 2013 at the Glücksgas Stadium in Dresden, Germany.

The pre-season matches started on 15 July 2013 with two matches at the same time to allow for all the players to get a run-out. The first was the traditional Billy Bly Memorial Trophy match  against North Ferriby United which City won 3–1. The second was against Winterton Rangers where City notched up a 6–0 victory.

In Portugal on 20 July 2013, the match against Sheffield Wednesday ended in a 0–0 draw. A further 0–0 draw against Braga on 23 July 2013 brought the Portugal training camp to a close.

Following return to England, an away match against Birmingham City on 27 July 2013 proved difficult, and Hull lost 2–1. This was followed on 29 July 2013 by another away match against Peterborough United, where Hull won 0–1.

On 2 August the team flew out to Germany for further training sessions ready for the two games there. City won the first match on 3 August 2013 against Dynamo Dresden,
with Yannick Sagbo scoring the only goal of the game. The second match in Germany on 6 August 2013 against Eintracht Braunschweig ended in a 2–0 defeat.

They finished the pre-season games with a 3–0 home win against Real Betis in the Andy Dawson testimonial match.

Competition

Overall

Premier League

League table

Results summary

Results by matchday

Matches

League Cup

Hull City enter the competition in Round Two, the draw for this took place on 8 August 2013 and Hull were drawn away to League One club Leyton Orient. Hull travelled to Orient on 27 August 2013 and drew the match 0–0. Extra-time was required and in the second-half substitute Robbie Brady broke the dead-lock with the only goal of the match soon after coming on to the pitch. The following day, the draw for the third round took place and City were drawn at home to local side Huddersfield Town of the Championship. The match was arranged for 24 September 2013. Nick Proschwitz scored the only goal in a 1–0 win to put Hull through to the fourth round of the cup. The draw for the 4th round took place the following day and set-up an all Premier League match with Tottenham Hotspur. The match will take place at White Hart Lane on 30 October, three days after the Premier League game between the teams. Following a 1–1 draw at full-time, extra time was played with both sides scoring a further goal. The match was determined by a penalty shoot-out, which City lost 8–7 when Ahmed Elmohamady's shot was saved by Brad Friedel.

FA Cup

Hull City enter the competition at the Third Round Proper stage with matches taking place in early January 2014. The draw for the Third Round took place on 8 December 2013 and Hull were drawn away to Football League Championship side Middlesbrough. The match took place on 4 January 2014 at the Riverside Stadium and Hull won the match 2–0 with goals by Aaron McLean and Nick Proschwitz. The draw for the fourth round took place on 5 January 2014 and Hull were drawn away to League Two team Southend United to face former manager Phil Brown for the first time since he left the club. The match took place on 25 January 2014 at Roots Hall with City leaving it until the second half to break the deadlock when Matty Fryatt scored both goals to take the visitors into the next round. The draw for the fifth round took place on 26 January 2014 and Hull were drawn away to  Championship side Brighton & Hove Albion. The match was selected for live TV  coverage by BT Sport and set to take place on 17 February 2014. The draw for the quarter-finals took place on 16 February and if Hull beat Brighton & Hove Albion they were drawn at home to Sunderland with match taking place on 8 or 9 March 2014. The fifth-round match took place at the Falmer Stadium on 17 February 2014 with Brighton & Hove taking the lead through a Leonardo Ulloa goal in the first half. The visitors levelled the game after 85 minutes when Yannick Sagbo hit the target. The score remained at 1–1 and a replay would be required to see who progressed. The replay was scheduled to take place on 24 February 2014 to avoid clashes with UEFA Champions League matches, which both managers criticised, as it is just 48-hours after important league matches for both teams.
Hull started the replay with first-half goals by Sone Aluko and Robert Koren, with Leonardo Ulloa scoring a second-half goal for Brighton. Hull went through to the next round with a 2–1 win in the replay. The next round match was selected for televising by ITV and was set to take place on Sunday 9 March.
The match took place in bright sunshine at the KC Stadium and both teams struggled in the first half to make any impact. A penalty was conceded by Sebastian Larsson of Sunderland but Sone Aluko's shot was saved by Oscar Ustari, leaving the match goalless at half-time. In the second-half Hull took the match with three goals in ten minutes by Curtis Davies, David Meyler and Matty Fryatt.

The draw for the semi-final took place immediately after the conclusion of the match and Hull were drawn first and paired with local Yorkshire side Sheffield United. Matches to take place over the weekend of 12 and 13 April 2014 at Wembley Stadium. Hull's match was subsequently set for 13 April at 16:00. Though the kick-off time was later revised to 16:07 to mark the 25th anniversary of the Hillsborough disaster. On 2 April Andre Marriner was announced as the match referee.

In the semi-final match Sheffield United started the better of the teams and took the lead with a  Jose Baxter goal. Hull levelled the score just before half-time through Yannick Sagbo, but Sheffield were quickly back in front when Stefan Scougall struck to leave city 2–1 behind at the break. City made two changes at half-time bringing on Matty Fryatt, for George Boyd, and Sone Aluko, for Maynor Figueroa. Matty Fryatt made an instant impact scoring the next goal with Tom Huddlestone and Stephen Quinn giving city the lead. Jamie Murphy pegged one back for Sheffield at the end of normal time but city sealed it with a David Meyler goal in added time. Giving Hull a 5–3 win and a first appearance in an FA Cup Final in their history.

The final against Arsenal took place at Wembley Stadium on 17 May 2014 with a kick-off time of 17:00, exactly the same time as the Magic Weekend rugby league match between Hull F.C. and Hull Kingston Rovers. The match referee was Lee Probert. In bright sunshine Hull took an early lead through James Chester and followed it by captain Curtis Davies netting after 8 minutes. Arsenal pulled one back through Santi Cazorla but it took until the second half for Arsenal to level through Laurent Koscielny. The game went to extra-time and the only goal came in the second-half through Aaron Ramsey giving Arsenal a 3–2 victory.

Statistics

Captains

Appearances

|}

Note: Appearances shown after a "+" indicate player came on during course of match.

Disciplinary record

Top scorers

Transfers
This section only lists transfers and loans for the 2013–14 season, which began 1 July 2013. For transactions in May and June 2013, see transfers and loans for the 2012–13 season.

Players in

Players out

Loans in

Loans out

Kits

On 11 May 2013 it was revealed that the kit for the 2013–14 season would be striped and that Cash Converters have taken up the option to extend their sponsorship deal for a further season.
On 10 June 2013 the adidas manufactured blue away kit was revealed.
The new home kit was revealed on the club website on 3 July 2013.

Awards

The annual awards was held on 7 May 2014.
The event was held at the KC Stadium and Curtis Davies was named Player of the Year and Player's Player of the Year, beating Ahmed Elmohamady.
Sone Aluko was awarded Goal of the Season for his strike against Newcastle United on 21 September 2013.

Notes

References

Hull City A.F.C. seasons
Hull City
2010s in Kingston upon Hull